The Battle of Canada may refer to...

Military Conflicts
 The French and Indian War — The North American theatre of the Seven Years' War between the British Empire, the Kingdom of France, and their allies.
 The Invasion of Quebec (1775) — The American Invasion of the British Province of Quebec during the American Revolutionary War. 
 The War of 1812 — A war between British North America and the United States from 1812 to 1815.
 The Battle of Cañada — An insurrection against the American occupation of New Mexico by Mexicans and Puebloans in 1847.

Sports
 The Battle of Canada — A Canadian soccer rivalry between FC Edmonton and the now defunct Ottawa Fury FC.